Pomona is a tram stop located just east of the junction of the Eccles Line and Trafford Park Line of Greater Manchester's light rail system, known as Metrolink. It opened to passengers on 6 December 1999, as part of Phase 2 of the network's expansion, at Pomona Docks in Old Trafford.

It was the least-used stop on the Metrolink network in 2018. However, it was always designed to support development as an interchange station between the Eccles Line and the Trafford Park Line which opened in March 2020.

Pomona Docks

Pomona tram stop is at the edge of the now disused Pomona Docks owned by the Peel Group.

Trafford Park Line extension
In 2016, Metrolink began construction of the Trafford Park Line, which would stem off the existing line at Pomona station. Supporting concrete blocks for the track had been in place since the station opened in 1999, with the line opening on 22 March 2020.

A bridge was built to connect the new alignment on the south of the Manchester Ship Canal to the existing route. The line proceeds straight from the station, in-between the Manchester Ship Canal and Bridgewater Canal. It then begins a gradual descent onto the left bank of the ship canal and runs parallel to it.

Services

Service pattern
6 minute service to Ashton-under-Lyne (peak).
12 minute service to Ashton-under-Lyne (off-peak).
12 minute service to Cornbrook
12 minute service to Eccles (via MediaCityUK at offpeak times).
12 minute service to MediaCityUK (peak).
12 minute service to the Trafford Centre

Connecting bus routes
Pomona station is not served directly by any bus service, but several services stop on Chester Road.

References

External links

Pomona Stop Information
Pomona area map
Pomona Redevelopment
Metrolink future network

Tram stops in Trafford
Tram stops on the Eccles to Piccadilly line
Tram stops on the MediaCityUK to Cornbrook line
Transport infrastructure completed in 1999
1999 establishments in England
Salford Quays
Railway stations in Great Britain opened in the 20th century